Wai Young (born May 20, 1960, in Hong Kong) is a Canadian politician from Vancouver, British Columbia. She represented the electoral district of Vancouver South for the Conservative Party of Canada from 2011 to 2015. She was elected to the House of Commons of Canada in the 2011 election, but was defeated by the Liberal Party candidate Harjit Sajjan in the 2015 election. She started her own municipal party, Coalition Vancouver, on June 21, 2018. She is leader of the party and ran as its mayoral candidate for the 2018 municipal election. She unsuccessfully contested the 2019 federal election.

Personal
Young was born in Hong Kong and immigrated to Canada at the age of four. She attended Killarney Secondary School and graduated from the University of British Columbia with a degree in sociology. Young has also taken post-graduate coursework in Mass Communications and Urban Planning and Design at Simon Fraser University and the British Columbia Institute of Technology. She is a mother of twins and has been the foster parent of seven children.

Before politics
Prior to being elected, Young was a consultant and small businesswoman who contributed to social policies and program development. Her clientele included all three levels of governments and community groups such as the Vancouver Chinatown Business Improvement Association, South Vancouver Policing Centre and S.U.C.C.E.S.S. Some of her work includes developing services for immigrants, and helping to found the Canadian Immigrant Settlement Sector Alliance (CISSA). Young founded and chaired Canada's first Youth-At-Risk Task Force, which became the National Crime Prevention Program  Young also established Canada's longest-running breakfast program for underprivileged children. Finally, Young also worked for the provincial Ministry of Children and Family Development and the federal ministry of Citizenship and Immigration Canada.

Wai Young has spent over thirty years working and volunteering in Vancouver's Downtown Eastside, at a number of community agencies including the Social Planning and Research Council of BC, Association of Neighbourhood Houses, the Strathcona Community Centre and YWCA Vancouver

Politics
After losing by 20 votes in the 2008 federal election, Young was elected in 2011 by a margin of nearly 4,000 votes in a closely watched rematch over former B.C. Premier Ujjal Dosanjh. In doing so, she became the first Conservative MP to be elected in Vancouver since 1988.

As the only Government MP in the City of Vancouver, Wai championed for over 60 major infrastructure projects. These projects included the Kitsilano Neighbourhood House, Supportive Community Housing, the Salvation Army Deborah's Gate Program, the Wavefront Wireless Commercialization Centre Society and the Asia Pacific Gateway Skills Program 

On October 26, 2011, Young was elected Vice-Chair of the Canada-China Legislative Association (CCLA). On March 5, 2013, Young was elected Chair of the CCLA. This association provides a forum for discussing bilateral and multilateral issues facing both Canada and China.

Regarding the first SkyTrain faregate, Young said "The new faregates will make SkyTrain service safer and more secure for commuters."

On January 7, 2014, Young announced $2.5 million of federal funding towards the Killarney Seniors Centre.

She was defeated by the Liberal Party candidate Harjit Sajjan in the 2015 election. She started her own municipal party, Coalition Vancouver, on June 21, 2018. She is leader of the party and ran as its mayoral candidate for the 2018 municipal election.

In July 2019, Young was announced as the Conservative candidate in Vancouver South for the 2019 election. She was defeated in a rematch with Sajjan.

Electoral record

Federal

Municipal

Awards
 Queens Diamond Jubilee Medal Recipient 
 YWCA Woman of Distinction Award Nominee
 Volunteer of the Year, Vancouver Board of Parks and Recreation

References

External links

1960 births
Living people
British Columbia Institute of Technology alumni
Businesspeople from Vancouver
Canadian women in business
Women members of the House of Commons of Canada
Conservative Party of Canada MPs
Hong Kong emigrants to Canada
Members of the House of Commons of Canada from British Columbia
Naturalized citizens of Canada
Politicians from Vancouver
University of British Columbia alumni
Women in British Columbia politics
21st-century Canadian politicians
21st-century Canadian women politicians
Canadian politicians of Chinese descent